Adlerberg is the name of the prominent Batlic noble family which originated from Sillerud in Värmland. Members of the family held significant positions within the Russian Empire, Sweden and Bavaria.

History 
The family can trace its lineage back to the Olov Svebilius, Archbishop of Uppsala, whose children were ennobled on 4 August 1684 with the name of Adlerberg by Charles XI. On 21 March 1810 they were awarded with the title of Baron in Sweden by Charles XIII, while on 14 June 1851, their cousins, who previously settled in Estonia, were elevated to the title of Count in Russia by Nicholas I of Russia. Swedish line of the family went extinct, while the Russian branch still exists in Russian diaspora.

Notable members 
 Amalie Adlerberg (1808–1888), Bavarian noblewoman and socialite
 Nikolay Adlerberg (1819–1892), Chancellor of State and Chamberlain at the Imperial court of Russia
 Vladimir Adlerberg (1791-1884), a General in the Imperial Army of Russia
 Julia Adlerberg (1760-1839), Baltic-German noblewoman, Principal of the Smolny Institute in Saint Petersburg

See also
Unetice culture, Bronze Age culture including Adlerberg group
Sashegy, hill and neighbourhood in Budapest, Hungary, formerly known as Adlerberg

Noble families